Detroit Township may refer to the following townships in the United States:

 Detroit Township, Pike County, Illinois
 Detroit Township, Becker County, Minnesota

For the city in Michigan, see Detroit